Ammayi Kosam is a 2001 Indian Telugu-language drama film produced by Pokuri Baburao and directed by Muppalaneni Shiva. This film stars Ravi Teja, Meena, Vineeth, Ali, and Siva Reddy in the main roles.

The story of this films revolves around four unemployed youth getting attracted to a girl and find their destination with her inspiration. The film was a remake of Tamil film Thulli Thirintha Kaalam.

Plot 
Venkat, Ravi, Balu and Venu are four unemployed youth who just pass their time by teasing women. Their parents keep scolding them for not being serious about their career and spoiling their name. A girl named Anjali moves into a neighboring house along with her family. After these four friends tried to tease her, instead of taking offense, she reciprocate the same with them. They later become good friends.

Anjali recognizes that each of the four friends has a unique talent. Venkat writes good poetry, Ravi is a bike racer, Balu has exemplary culinary skills and Venu is skilled at mimicry. She encourages them to improve their skills in their respective fields. On her birthday, all of them present a gift to her, after stealing something from their homes to propose their love. She accepts all four proposals and promise each to marry them only if they return after becoming successful in their career. They work hard and settle in their careers. When they return, actually wanting to marry her, they realize that she is marrying someone else, an army man. They try to stop the marriage accusing her of cheating them. Anjali's father reveals their flashback about how he lost his son because of not guiding him properly. Anjali did not want to see anyone to meet the same fate as her brother and diverted their energies to excel in their careers, in the name of love. The story ends with the four friends realizing Anjali's greatness and performing her marriage with the army man.

Cast

Music 
Vandemataram Srinivas composed music for this film. This album has six songs. Sirivennela Seetarama Sastri, Samavedam Shanmukha Sarma, Bhuvana Chandra, Chandrabose penned the lyrics. S. P. Balasubrahmanyam, K. S. Chitra, Unni Krishnan, Swarnalatha, Sonu Nigam, Udit Narayan, Hariharan, Vandemataram sang the tracks.

References

External links 
 
 Ammayi Kosam on Youtube

2000s Telugu-language films
Indian buddy drama films
Telugu remakes of Tamil films
Films scored by Vandemataram Srinivas
Films directed by Muppalaneni Shiva
2000s buddy drama films
2001 drama films
2001 films